The following is a list of squads for each nation competing in football at the 2018 Central American and Caribbean Games in Barranquilla.

Group A

Colombia
Head Coach:  Arturo Reyes Montero

Costa Rica
Head coach:  Marcelo Herrera

Honduras
Head Coach:  Carlos Tábora

Trinidad and Tobago

Group B

El Salvador
Head Coach:  	Alexsander Rodríguez

Mexico
Head Coach:  Marco Antonio Ruiz

Haiti
Head coach:  Jérôme Velfert

Venezuela
Head coach:  Rafael Dudamel

References

Men
2018